Trail of Tsathogghua is a Horror tabletop role-playing adventure, written by Keith Herber, with art by Steve Purcell, and published by Chaosium in 1984. It was released in PDF format in 2004. Three horror adventures set in Greenland, Canada and Grand Rapids, Michigan for Call of Cthulhu, based on author Clark Ashton Smith's god-like literary creation Tsathoggua.

Contents
Trail of Tsathogghua is an adventure in which the player characters investigate a stone slab covered with unusual markings that was discovered in Greenland by Eskimos.

Reception
Rick Swan reviewed Trail of Tsathogghua in The Space Gamer No. 75. Swan commented that "If you've been happily devouring Chaosium's Cthulhu releases, rest assured that Trail of Tsathogghua is another top-notch effort. This is roleplaying at its finest, and I'm ready for the next one. And who knows . . . maybe it'll even have a title I can pronounce."

Reviews
Jeux & Stratégie #33 (as "La trace de Tsathogghua")

References

External links 
 

Call of Cthulhu (role-playing game) adventures
Role-playing game supplements introduced in 1984